Seraphim (bishop) may refer to:
Russia
Seraphim Chichagov
Seraphim (Glushakov)
Seraphim (Nikitin)
Canada
Seraphim Storheim

Human name disambiguation pages